The Business Council is an organization of business leaders headquartered in Washington, D.C. It holds meetings several times a year for high-level policy discussions.

Mission 
The Business Council allows global CEOs to gather and network in private. Membership is by invitation-only. The organization is guided by the belief that the business community's contributions to public discourse and governance are in the interest of the common good of the American people.

During the COVID-19 pandemic, The Business Council helped global companies navigate the public health crisis.

Leadership 
Marlene Colucci serves as CEO of The Business Council. Appointed in 2013, Colucci has held leadership positions in public policy at the White House, U.S. Department of Labor, and American Hotel and Lodging Association. She describes the organization as "an important voice for the business community with a high level of personal engagement by its members.”

Prior to Colucci, Philip Cassidy served as executive director of The Business Council for more than two decades.

History
The Business Council was founded by Secretary of Commerce Daniel C. Roper and investment banker Sidney Weinberg as the Business Advisory Council for the United States Department of Commerce in 1933, under President Franklin D. Roosevelt. It formed the Industrial Advisory Board for the National Recovery Administration during the Great Depression. It also established committees to discuss the Securities Exchange Act of 1934, the Banking Act of 1935 and the Social Security Act.

According to the Detroit Free Press, the organization was designed “for corporate titans to offer counsel and advise to the federal government.” It was renamed The Business Council as an organization independent from the Department of Commerce in 1961, under President John F. Kennedy. The group is now “more about camaraderie and exchanging of ideas for time-pressed CEOs.”

Membership is limited to 200 active members, all of whom are CEOs of leading multinational businesses personally selected by fellow members of The Business Council.

The organization is strictly nonpartisan. It is headquartered in Washington, D.C.

Current executive committee 
The executive committee is composed of the following people:

Chairman
 Satya Nadella, Chairman and CEO, Microsoft

Members
 Corie Barry, CEO, Best Buy
 Jeff Bezos, Founder & former CEO, Amazon.com
 Ana Botín, Executive Chairman, Santander Group
 Gail K. Boudreaux, President & CEO, Elevance Health, Inc.
 Mary Dillon, Former Executive Chair and CEO, Ulta Beauty
 Jamie Dimon, Chairman & CEO, JPMorgan Chase & Co.
 John Donahoe, President and CEO, Nike
 Arnold Donald, President and CEO, Carnival Corporation
 Roger Ferguson, Former President and CEO, TIAA
 Alex Gorsky, Chairman & CEO, Johnson & Johnson
 Henry R. Kravis, Executive Co-Chairman, Kohlberg Kravis Roberts
 Dave MacLennan, Chairman and Chief Executive Officer, Cargill
 Shantanu Narayen, Chairman, President, and CEO, Adobe Systems
 David M. Solomon, Chairman and CEO, Goldman Sachs
 Carol Tomé, CEO, UPS
 Lisa Wardell, Executive Chairman, Adtalem Global Education
 Kathy Warden, Chairman, CEO, and President, Northrop Grumman
 Emma Walmsley, CEO, GlaxoSmithKline
 Mike Wirth, Chairman & CEO, Chevron Corporation

Former chairs

1933: Gerard Swope, General Electric
1934: S. Clay Williams, RJ Reynolds Tobacco Company
1934–35: Henry P. Kendall, Kendall Company	
1936: George H. Mead, Mead Corporation
1937–39: W. Averell Harriman, Brown Brothers & Co.
1940–41: William L. Batt, War Production Board
1942–43: R. R. Deupree, Procter & Gamble
1944–45: Thomas B. McCabe, Scott Paper Company
1946: George M. Humphrey, National Steel Corporation
1947–48: John L. Collyer, Goodrich Corporation
1949–50: James S. Knowlson, Stewart-Warner
1951–52: Robert T. Stevens, JP Stevens & Company
1953: John D. Biggers, Libbey-Owens-Ford
1954–55: Harold Boeschenstein, Owens Corning
1956–57: Eugene Holman, Standard Oil of New Jersey (today ExxonMobil)
1958–59: Stephen Bechtel, Jr., Bechtel
1960–61: Ralph J. Cordiner, General Electric
1961–62: Roger Blough, US Steel
1963–64: F. R. Kappel, AT&T
1965–66: W.B. Murphy, Campbell Soup Company
1967–68: Albert L. Nickerson, Mobil (today ExxonMobil)
1969–70: Fred J. Borch, General Electric
1971–72: William M. Batten, JCPenney
1973–74: David Packard, Hewlett-Packard
1975–76: Edmund W. Littlefield, General Electric
1977–78: John D. deButts, AT&T
1979–80: Reginald H. Jones, General Electric
1981–82: Walter B. Wriston, Citicorp
1983–84: Clifton C. Garvin, Jr., Exxon (today ExxonMobil)
1985–86: Ruben F. Mettler, TRW
1987–88: Stephen Bechtel, Jr., Bechtel
1989–90: Roger B. Smith, General Motors
1991–92: John F. Welch, Jr., General Electric
1993–94: Robert E. Allen, AT&T
1995–96: Edgar S. Woolard, Jr., DuPont
1997–98: Larry Bossidy, AlliedSignal
1999-00: Ralph S. Larsen, Johnson & Johnson
2001–02: William T. Esrey, Sprint Corporation
2003–04: Charles O. Holliday, Jr., Bank of America
2005–06: Jeffrey R. Immelt, General Electric
2007–08: W. James McNerney, Jr., Boeing
2009–10: James W. Owens, Caterpillar.
2011–12: Jamie Dimon, JPMorgan Chase
2013–14: Andrew Liveris, Dow Chemical Company
2015–16: Jeff Bezos, Amazon
2017-18: Henry R. Kravis, Kohlberg Kravis Roberts
2019-20: John Donahoe, Nike

References

External links 
 The Business Council

Organizations established in 1933
Lobbying organizations based in Washington, D.C.
1933 establishments in Washington, D.C.